Chunchun Prasad Yadav (born 11 March 1932) was a leader of Janata Dal  from Bihar. He served as member of the Lok Sabha representing Bhagalpur (Lok Sabha constituency). He was elected to 9th, 10th and 11th Lok Sabha.

Personal life
Chunchun Prasad Yadav was born to Banwari Prasad Yadav on 11 March 1932 in Baluachak in Bhagalpur district, Bengal Presidency (present Bihar). He did B.A., B.T. (basic trained) from Marwari College, Bhagalpur and Teachers Training Centre, Fulwaria, Bhagalpur. He married Chintamani Devi, with whom he has three sons and three daughters.

Politics
From 1969 to 77 and 1985 to 89, Yadav was a member of Bihar Legislative Assembly. From 1969 to 71 and 1974 to 77, he was a member of the Committee on Government Assurances. He was the Minister of State, Health, Bihar from March 1972 to April 1973. In the mid to late 1980s, he was a member of Zila Parishad and Panchayati Raj Committee, Bihar; Public Accounts Committee, Bihar Legislative Assembly and the General Secretary, Lok Dal, Bihar.

He was elected to the 9th Lok Sabha in 1989, reelected in the 10th Lok Sabha in 1991 and was a Consultative Committee, Ministry of Mines (1991 - 1996) and Member, Standing Committee on Defence (1993-96). Yadav was elected in the 11th Lok Sabha in 1996 for the third time in 1996.

References

India MPs 1991–1996
People from Bhagalpur district
1960 births
Living people
India MPs 1996–1997
India MPs 1989–1991
Lok Sabha members from Bihar